Brickley is a surname. Notable people with the surname include:

 Andy Brickley (born 1961), American ice hockey player, grandson of George
 Charles Brickley (1891–1949), American football player and coach
 Connor Brickley (born 1992), American ice hockey player
 Dennis Brickley (1929–1983), English footballer
 George Brickley (1894–1947), American Major League Baseball and football player, brother of Charles
 James H. Brickley (1928–2001), Lieutenant Governor of Michigan and member of the Michigan Supreme Court
 Shirley Brickley (1944–1977), American singer, member of the Orlons R&B group

Fictional characters include:
John Brickley, a main character in the war film They Were Expendable, played by Robert Montgomery

See also
 Brickley Engine, an internal combustion engine
 New York Brickley Giants, American football team which played in 1921 season only, named after coach Charles Brickley